King Malachi "Mel" Street (October 21, 1935 – October 21, 1978) was an American country music singer who had 13 top-20 hits on the Billboard country charts.

Biography
Street was born near Grundy, Virginia, United States. Publications cite his year of birth as 1933, although his family maintains that he was born in 1935 and his gravestone gives the year as 1936.
He began performing on western Virginia and West Virginia radio shows at the age of sixteen. Street subsequently worked as a radio tower electrician in Ohio, and as a nightclub performer in the Niagara Falls, New York area. He moved back to West Virginia in 1963 to open an auto body shop.

From 1968 to 1972, Street hosted a show on a Bluefield, West Virginia television station. He recorded his first single, "Borrowed Angel" – which he also wrote – in 1969 for a small regional record label, Tandem Records. A larger label, Royal American Records, picked it up in 1972 and it became a top-10 Billboard hit. He recorded the biggest hit of his career, "Lovin' on Back Streets", in 1972.

Street's last television appearance was in 1977, in which he performed his 1976 hit "I Met A Friend Of Yours Today" on That Good Ole Nashville Music.

Street recorded several hits in the mid-1970s, such as "You Make Me Feel More Like a Man," "Forbidden Angel," "I Met a Friend of Yours Today," "If I Had a Cheatin' Heart," and "Smokey Mountain Memories". He signed with Mercury Records in 1978, but suffering from clinical depression and alcoholism, he killed himself by a self-inflicted gunshot on October 21, 1978, his 43rd birthday. He had a record debut on the country charts on October 21 as well, called "Just Hangin' On", and later charted four posthumous songs.  Street's idol, George Jones, sang "Amazing Grace" at his funeral.

His posthumous album, Mel Street's Greatest Hits, was promoted via television advertisements in 1981, and sold 400,000 copies.

Discography

Albums

Singles

Footnotes

References
 Huey, Steve. (2003). Edited by Vladimir Bogdanov, Chris Woodstra, & Stephen Erlewine. "Mel Street (King Malachi Street)." All Music Guide to Country, 2nd ed. San Francisco: Backbeat Books, 2003. 
Schuler, Dennis Sr. and Larry J. Delp. Mel Street – A Country Legend, Charleston, WV: Mountain State Press, 2002.

External links
Mel Street @ Last.fm

1935 births
1978 deaths
1978 suicides
People from Grundy, Virginia
American male singer-songwriters
American country singer-songwriters
Mercury Records artists
Polydor Records artists
20th-century American singers
Singer-songwriters from Virginia
20th-century American male singers
Suicides by firearm in Tennessee